den Uyl, a Dutch surname (in modern Dutch spelling rendered den Uijl), may refer to:

 Bob den Uyl (1930-1992), Dutch writer
 Jan den Uyl (1595/1596-1640), Dutch painter
 Joop den Uyl (1919-1987), Dutch politician and prime minister
 Douglas Den Uyl (1950–present), American philosopher

Dutch-language surnames